ISO 3166-2:KN is the entry for Saint Kitts and Nevis in ISO 3166-2, part of the ISO 3166 standard published by the International Organization for Standardization (ISO), which defines codes for the names of the principal subdivisions (e.g., provinces or states) of all countries coded in ISO 3166-1.

Currently for Saint Kitts and Nevis, ISO 3166-2 codes are defined for two levels of subdivisions:
 2 states (i.e., the islands of Saint Kitts and Nevis)
 14 parishes

Each code consists of two parts, separated by a hyphen. The second part is either of the following:
 one letter: states
 two digits (01–15 except 14): parishes

Current codes
Subdivision names are listed as in the ISO 3166-2 standard published by the ISO 3166 Maintenance Agency (ISO 3166/MA).

Click on the button in the header to sort each column.

States

Parishes

 Notes

Changes
The following changes to the entry have been announced in newsletters by the ISO 3166/MA since the first publication of ISO 3166-2 in 1998:

See also
 Subdivisions of Saint Kitts and Nevis
 FIPS region codes of Saint Kitts and Nevis

External links
 ISO Online Browsing Platform: KN
 Parishes of Saint Kitts-Nevis, Statoids.com

2:KN
ISO 3166-2
Saint Kitts and Nevis geography-related lists